Requejo y Corús is a locality and minor local entity located in the municipality of Villagatón, in León province, Castile and León, Spain. As of 2020, it has a population of 45.

Geography 
Requejo y Corús is located 85km west of León, Spain.

References

Populated places in the Province of León